Abū ʿAlī ʿĪsā ibn Isḥāq ibn Zurʿa (943–1008) was a medieval physician and philosopher. He was born in Abbasid Baghdad to a Syriac Jacobite Christian family. He was a student of Yahya ibn Adi. He was accused of engaging in trade with the Byzantines and convicted. His possessions were confiscated and he died in Baghdad in 1008.

Ibn Zurʿa may be the philosopher "Antecer" cited by Pedro Gallego in his Latin works of the 13th century, if the latter is a garbled version of Avençer.

Notes

References
Marc Bergé, Les Arabes (1978), p. 343.
Herbert Fergus Thomson, Four Treatises by Isa Ibn Zura (1952).

10th-century philosophers
Aristotelian philosophers
Christian philosophers
Syriac–Arabic translators
Syriac Orthodox Christians
People from Baghdad
943 births
1008 deaths
10th-century Arabic writers
Physicians from the Abbasid Caliphate
Christianity in the Abbasid Caliphate